USS LSM-216 was a  built for the U.S. Navy during World War II. Like many of her class, she was not named and is properly referred to by her hull designation.

LSM-216 was laid down by the Dravo Corporation of Wilmington, Delaware; launched on an unknown date; and commissioned on 29 July 1944.

During World War II LSM-216 was assigned to the Asiatic-Pacific theater and participated in the Assault and occupation of Iwo Jima in February 1945. In the film To the Shores of Iwo Jima, LSM-216 can be seen in action just off Yellow Beach on 19 February 1945.

Following the war, LSM-216 was decommissioned on 2 May 1946 at Calcasieu River, Lake Charles, Louisiana. She was struck from the Naval Register and sold in November 1946 to the navy of the Dominican Republic. She was renamed  and served in the Dominican Republic Navy until she was disposed of in 1960.

LSM-216 earned one battle star for World War II service.

References

See also
 List of United States Navy LSMs

Ships built in Wilmington, Delaware
World War II amphibious warfare vessels of the United States
LSM-1-class landing ships medium
Ships transferred from the United States Navy to the Dominican Navy
Ships built by Dravo Corporation